The  is an electric multiple unit (EMU) train type operated by the private railway operator Choshi Electric Railway in Chiba Prefecture, Japan, since July 2010. The two two-car sets were converted from former Iyo Railway 800 series EMU cars, which were themselves converted from former Keio Corporation 2010 series EMUs built in 1962, and were introduced to replace the Choshi Electric Railway's ageing 700 and 800 series EMU cars.

Formations
The two two-car sets are each formed of a driving motor (Mc) car and driving trailer (Tc) car as shown below, with the DeHa 2000 cars at the Chōshi end.

The DeHa 2000 cars were originally fitted with one lozenge type pantograph.
The pantograph on DeHa 2001 was damaged on 20 October 2013, entailing its replacement with a spare single-arm pantograph from 22 October - a first for trains on the line.

External livery

Set 2001
Set 2001 initially carried the all-over green livery originally carried in its Keio days. Following general overhaul in December 2017, car KuHa 2501 was repainted into a new livery of dark blue and light grey, with car DeHa 2001 remaining in the same all-over green livery it carried from its introduction on the Choshi Electric Railway.

Set 2002
Set 2002 was initially painted into all-over cream livery and entered service in July 2010 with advertising vinyls promoting the local Aeon shopping mall. The advertising contract with Aeon for set 2002 expired on 21 November 2012, and from December, the set was returned to service in the cream livery with red bodyside line as carried by the Keio 2010 series EMUs in their later days. Set 2002 was scheduled to run in this livery until 16 September 2013, after which date it received a "90th Anniversary livery", consisting of the addition of black and red paintwork to the non-gangwayed cab end. Following the completion of accident damage repairs in March 2015, set 2002 was repainted in the early Choshi Electric Railway livery of red and beige, returning to service in April 2015.

Interior
The trains feature longitudinal seating, and are equipped with fare collection boxes at each end for wanman driver only operation. The trains are also the first Choshi Electric Railway trains to be equipped with air-conditioning, although initially it was used only in simple ventilation mode, due to the insufficient capacity of the line's power supply. From late June 2013, however, a static inverter was added, enabling the air-conditioning to be used.

History

The four cars in operation were originally built in 1962 by Hitachi and Nippon Sharyo as 2010 series trains for use on the  gauge Keio Line in Tokyo. 18 2010 series cars were purchased from Keio between 1984 and 1985 by the Iyo Railway in Shikoku, becoming the 800 series. Regauging work for use on the  gauge Iyo line involved modifying the Nippon Sharyo NA-318 and Tokyu Car TS-321A bogies on the trailer (non-motored) cars and replacing the bogies on motored cars with Tokyu TS-307 bogies from former Keio Inokashira Line 1000 series EMUs withdrawn in 1984. On the Iyo Railway, the 800 series trains initially operated as 3-car sets, but in 1994, driving cabs based on the design of the former Keio 5000 series EMUs were added to the intermediate SaHa 850 cars to create two-car sets formed as MoHa 820 + KuHa 850. This is the reason for the differing style driving cabs on each end of the present-day 2000 series sets.

Two two-car 800 series trains (MoHa 822 + KuHa 852 and MoHa 823 + KuHa 853) were purchased from the Iyo Railway in November 2009, and were modified for driver-only-operation and repainted at the line's Nakanocho Depot by Keisei Sharyo engineers, becoming the Choshi Electric Railway 2000 series. The trains entered service on 24 July 2010.

Individual car histories

Accidents
On 11 January 2014, at 08:19, set 2002 derailed on points on the approach to Kasagami-Kurohae Station while on a service from Tokawa to Choshi. Two of the train's bogies were derailed, but the train remained upright. The unit remained out of service due to the lack of funds to carry out repairs, but later in 2014, students from the Choshi Commercial Senior High School used crowdfunding to raise 4.84 million yen in a period of two months to help cover the cost of repair work. Repairs were completed in March 2015, with the train returning to passenger service on 4 April 2015.

References

External links

 Official profile of 2000 series 

Electric multiple units of Japan
Train-related introductions in 2010
Hitachi multiple units
ja:銚子電気鉄道線#車両
600 V DC multiple units
Nippon Sharyo multiple units